Malleco Province is one of two provinces in the southern Chilean region of La Araucanía (IX). The provincial capital is the city of Angol.
 
Malleco Province is known for having the emblematic Malleco Viaduct and the Las Raíces Tunnel, Chile's longest tunnel, which links the eastern part to the rest of the province.

Communes
As one of Chile's second level administrative divisions, Malleco comprises eleven communes, each administered by its respective municipality.

 Angol
 Renaico
 Collipulli
 Lonquimay
 Curacautín
 Ercilla
 Victoria
 Traiguén
 Lumaco
 Purén
 Los Sauces

Geography and demography

Of these, 151,057 (73.6%) lived in urban areas and 54,067 (26.4%) in rural areas. Between the 2002 and 2017 censuses, the population rose by 1.7% (3,509 persons).

Malleco Valley wine region
Located 340 miles (540 km) south of the capital of Chile, Santiago, the Malleco wine region lies in the province of the same name. It is one of Chile’s southern Denomination of Origin (DO) regions as defined by the Chilean Appellation system, the legally protected geographical indication used to identify where the grapes for a wine were grown.
The wine industry here is still developing but good results are already being obtained, particularly from its crispy and fresh Chardonnay and Pinot Noir.
The climate is cool, with a high level of rainfall (51 inches (1300 mm) a year), a short growing season, and high temperature variation between day and night, which is challenging for wine producers. Most vineyards are located around the town of Traiguen, just south of the Bio Bio Valley. The volcanic soil in Malleco, composed mainly of sand and clay, are reasonably well drained. Although the valley has high rainfall, vines have to make extra effort to hydrate due to the well-drained soil, which results in less foliage and lower grape yields. All these factors produce grapes with more concentrated flavour and excellent structure, which in turn leads to the crisp and fresh wine produced in the region.

Grape distribution by varietal

 Climate: Cool Mediterranean climate. 1300 mm (51.2 in) of rain per year.
 Soils: Volcanic soils, clay and sand.
 Primary wines: Chardonnay and Pinot Noir.
 
 

 
Total hectares planted: 11 ha (27 acres).

See also
 Chilean wine
 Maule Region
 Maule River
 Maipo Valley

References

 

Provinces of Chile
Provinces of La Araucanía Region